Lake Koman is a reservoir on the Drin River in northern Albania. Lake Koman is surrounded by dense forested hills, vertical slopes, deep gorges, and a narrow valley, completely taken up by the river. Besides the Drin, it is fed by the Shala and Valbona Rivers.

The combination of specific topography and hydrological conditions have contributed to the formation of different habitats. The golden jackal, red fox, european badger, eurasian otter, beech marten, european polecat are the primary predatory mammals. A high number of bird species have been observed in the region, including the common kingfisher, common quail, grey heron, eurasian wryneck, great spotted woodpecker and black-headed gull.

The Lake Koman Ferry operates daily on the lake from Koman to Fierza. The ferry connects the city of Bajram Curri to the region of Tropojë. The journey takes about two and a half hours and is also popular with the foreign tourists. Smaller boats bring people and goods to remote villages, which are often far away from the lake, but can only be reached by water.

See also 
 
 Drin River
 Koman Hydroelectric Power Station
 Geography of Albania
 Lakes of Albania

References 

 

Koman
Geography of Kukës County
Geography of Shkodër County
Tourist attractions in Kukës County
Tourist attractions in Shkodër County